Maiestas veinatus (formerly Recilia veinatus) is a species of insect from the Cicadellidae family that is endemic to India. It was formerly placed within Recilia, but a 2009 revision moved it to Maiestas.

References

Insects described in 1930
Endemic fauna of India
Hemiptera of Asia
Maiestas